Seven Hills is an unincorporated community and a census-designated place (CDP) located in and governed by Boulder County, Colorado, United States. The CDP is a part of the Boulder, CO Metropolitan Statistical Area. The population of the Seven Hills CDP was 121 at the United States Census 2010. The Boulder post office (Zip Code 80302) serves the area.

Geography
Seven Hills is located in central Boulder County, in the hills west of the city of Boulder. It lies between Sunshine Canyon Drive, which forms the northeast edge of the CDP, and Fourmile Canyon Drive, which touches the southwest edge of the CDP. Poorman Road connects the two drives, running through the center of the CDP.

Demographics

See also

Outline of Colorado
Index of Colorado-related articles
State of Colorado
Colorado cities and towns
Colorado census designated places
Colorado counties
Boulder County, Colorado
Colorado metropolitan areas
Front Range Urban Corridor
North Central Colorado Urban Area
Denver-Aurora-Boulder, CO Combined Statistical Area
Boulder, CO Metropolitan Statistical Area

References

External links

Boulder County website

Census-designated places in Boulder County, Colorado
Census-designated places in Colorado
Denver metropolitan area